Panthiades bitias is a butterfly in the family Lycaenidae. It was described by Pieter Cramer in 1777. It is found from Mexico to the Amazon and Suriname.

References

Butterflies described in 1777
Eumaeini
Lycaenidae of South America